Horst Heldt (born 9 December 1969) is a German football executive and former player who played as a midfielder. He is the former general manager of 1. FC Köln.

Playing career
Heldt was born in Königswinter. He played at 1. FC Köln from 1990 until 1995, before transferring to TSV 1860 Munich. After four years there, he went to Eintracht Frankfurt in 1999. After the club was relegated in 2001, he played for Austrian side Sturm Graz. In January 2003, Heldt returned to Germany, to VfB Stuttgart.

He always played as a midfielder. His tally of Bundesliga matches is 359. Heldt also played for the German national team twice in 1999.

Managerial career
After only being a substitute and not getting any playing time at VfB Stuttgart in the first half of the 2005–06 season under coach Giovanni Trapattoni, Heldt decided to end his active career on 3 January 2006 to take over the post of general manager of the club.

As manager, Heldt supported the sacking of Trapattoni and the hiring of new coach Armin Veh. Due to Heldt, Veh's initial stop-gap contract was extended into the 2006–07 season which became Stuttgart's most successful ever, winning the championship and qualifying for the German Cup final.

On 3 July 2010, he moved to Schalke 04. After the sacking of Felix Magath, Heldt became responsible for sport and communications on the managing board of Schalke. Heldt decided to step down at the end of the 2015–16 season.

Heldt worked for Hannover 96 from March 2017 to April 2019. In summer, Hannover was promoted to the Bundesliga.

On 9 April 2019, Hannover 96 announced the release of Heldt.

On 19 November 2019, 1. FC Köln announced Heldt as new general manager alongside new head coach Markus Gisdol.

References

External links
 
 
 

1969 births
Living people
People from Königswinter
Sportspeople from Cologne (region)
German footballers
Association football midfielders
Bundesliga players
1. FC Köln players
TSV 1860 Munich players
Eintracht Frankfurt players
SK Sturm Graz players
VfB Stuttgart players
VfB Stuttgart II players
Germany international footballers
Germany under-21 international footballers
1999 FIFA Confederations Cup players
Footballers from North Rhine-Westphalia
West German footballers